Fourteen Peaks may refer to:

 Eight-thousanders, the fourteen mountains over 8000 metres
 Fourteeners, the mountains in the United States over 14000 feet
 Welsh 3000s, the mountains in Wales over 3000 feet